Edward Fielden may refer to:

 Edward Fielden (RAF officer) (1903–1976), Royal Air Force pilot and World War II veteran
 Edward Fielden (politician) (1857–1942), British businessman and Conservative Party politician